Hugh Thompson is a Canadian stage and screen actor known for Blessed Stranger: After Flight 111, Black Harbour and Forgive Me.

Career 
Thompson won the Gemini Award for Blessed Stranger: After Flight 111. He was nominated for an ACTRA Award and a Canadian Screen Award for his work on Forgive Me. For his theatre work, Thompson was honored by the Robert Merritt Awards for  his performances in Whale Riding Weather in 2013 for The Beauty Queen of Leenane in 2012, for Kingfisher Days in 2018, and was nominated for his work in Jacob's Wake in 2004 and Some Blow Flutes in 2019.

His other film credits have included Noise, Whole New Thing, Poor Boy's Game, Copperhead, Splinters and Stage Mother.

Filmography

Film

Television

References

External links 

Year of birth missing (living people)
Living people
Canadian male film actors
Canadian male television actors
Canadian male stage actors
Male actors from Nova Scotia